James and Aerianthi Coussoulis Arena or Coussoulis Arena is a 4,140-seat multi-purpose arena in San Bernardino, California, United States, on the campus of California State University, San Bernardino. It is named for James & Aerianthi Coussoulis.

It is home to the Cal State San Bernardino Coyotes men's basketball, women's basketball and women's volleyball teams. It hosts many other functions including commencement, concerts, Harlem Globetrotters basketball, WWE professional wrestling, comedy shows, band competitions and arts and music festivals.

See also
 Cal State San Bernardino Coyotes

References

External links
 Official website

Basketball venues in California
Cal State San Bernardino Coyotes sports venues
College basketball venues in the United States
College volleyball venues in the United States
Sports venues in San Bernardino, California
Volleyball venues in California
Sports venues completed in 1995
1995 establishments in California